Tibor Bédi (born 22 March 1974, in Budapest) is a retired Hungarian hurdler. He represented his country at the 2000 Summer Olympics, as well as the 1999 World Championships.

His personal best in the 400 metres hurdles is 49.00 seconds set in Seville in 1999.

Competition record

References

1974 births
Living people
Athletes from Budapest
Hungarian male hurdlers
World Athletics Championships athletes for Hungary
Olympic athletes of Hungary
Athletes (track and field) at the 2000 Summer Olympics